Tubulella is a genus of stem-group cnidarians from the Burgess Shale.

References

Burgess Shale fossils
Prehistoric cnidarian genera
Fossil taxa described in 1899

Cambrian genus extinctions